The Frederick H. Alms Memorial Park is a Cincinnati park in the community of Mt. Lookout/Columbia-Tusculum, most often called "Alms Park" for short, owned and operated by the Cincinnati Park Board. Its entrance is located at 650 Tusculum Avenue.

In 1916,  of land was donated to the city by Mrs. Frederick H. Alms on the condition a park be established in honor of her late husband.  The land was originally owned by Nicholas Longworth, once the wealthiest man in Cincinnati and patriarch of the Longworth family.

The landscaping was designed by the Cleveland, Ohio, landscape architect Albert Davis Taylor. The park's centerpiece, a pavilion in the Italian Renaissance style, was completed in 1929 by architects Stanley Matthews and Charles Wilkins Short, Jr.

Alms Park is also home to the “Alms Park Badger”, one of a number of regional cryptids, the most famous of which is the Loveland Frog. Badger “sightings” have been reported since the early 1970s.

A bronze statue of Stephen Foster, author of "My Old Kentucky Home", was installed in Alms Park in 1937. It faces south, towards the hills of Kentucky.

References

Parks in Cincinnati